Sujit may refer to:

Sujit Bose, Indian cricketer
Sujit Chakravarty, Indian footballer
Sujit Guha, Bengali filmmaker
Sujit Kumar, Indian actor
Sujit Minchekar, Sri Lankan politician
Sujit Mukherjee, Indian writer
Sujit Nayak, Indian cricketer
Sujit Roy, Indian cricketer
Sujit Minchekar, Indian politician